Thomas Edward Downey (January 1, 1884 – August 3, 1961) was a major league baseball player.

Born in Lewiston, Maine, Downey played on several baseball teams after his first professional appearance at age 25 on May 7, 1909. Downey played for the Cincinnati Reds from 1909 until 1911, both the Philadelphia Phillies and the Chicago Cubs in 1912, and from 1914 to 1915, the Buffalo Buffeds/Blues. He both batted and threw the ball right-handed. His last game, ending a six-year Major League career, was on September 30, 1915. He died in Passaic, New Jersey.

External links
The Baseball Page: Tom Downey
Baseball-Reference.com Tom Downey statistics
 

1884 births
1961 deaths
Cincinnati Reds players
Philadelphia Phillies players
Chicago Cubs players
Buffalo Buffeds players
Buffalo Blues players
Major League Baseball shortstops
Baseball players from Maine
Sportspeople from Lewiston, Maine
Bridgeport Orators players
Lancaster Red Roses players
Birmingham Barons players
Louisville Colonels (minor league) players
Indianapolis Indians players
Baltimore Orioles (IL) players
Newark Bears (IL) players
Jersey City Skeeters players
Kansas City Blues (baseball) managers
Meriden Silverites players